Gustaf Vilhelm "Gösta" Carlsson (2 February 1906 – 5 October 1992) was a Swedish cyclist. He competed at the 1928 Summer Olympics and won bronze medals in the individual and team road races.

Nationally Carlsson won three individual (100 km, 1926–28) and nine team road race titles (1925–32). In retirement he worked as an elementary school teacher.

References

1906 births
1992 deaths
Swedish male cyclists
Olympic cyclists of Sweden
Cyclists at the 1928 Summer Olympics
Olympic bronze medalists for Sweden
Olympic medalists in cycling
Sportspeople from Uppsala
Medalists at the 1928 Summer Olympics
20th-century Swedish people